Khadir Mohideen College is one of the oldest Minority colleges in Tamil Nadu, established on 5 July 1955. This college is nationally re-accredited with 'B' Grade by NAAC. It is affiliated to Bharathidasan University, Tiruchirappalli. It offers more than 52 Undergraduate, Postgraduate, Research, Diploma and Certificate programmes under Government Aided  and Unaided streams. Khadir Mohideen College registers an enrollment of over 3000 students annually. It is located in Adirampattinam, Thanjavur District, Tamil Nadu, India.

History
Khadir Mohideen College is one of the oldest Minority colleges in Tamil Nadu, established in the year of 1955 as an affiliated college to the University of Madras and then affiliated to Bharathidasan University, Tiruchirappalli. The College was re-accredited (Second cycle) with ‘B’ grade by NAAC in 2011. The college is governed by M.K.N.Madharasa Trust-Waqf and offers degree programs from Undergraduate to Research level under Government Aided and Unaided streams. The College is located in Adirampattinam, Thanjavur District, Tamil Nadu, India.

Under Graduate Courses (Aided)

Arts Courses
 B.A Economics
 B.A History 
 B.Com. (General)
 B.B.A

Science Courses
 B.Sc Chemistry
 B.Sc Computer Science
 B.Sc Mathematics
 B.Sc Zoology

Under Graduate Courses (Unaided)

Arts Courses
 B.A - Arabic (Girls only)
 B.A. English
 B.B.A. (Girls only)
 B.Com. (Girls only)
 B.Lit. Tamil

Science Courses
 B.C.A. (Co-Education)
 B.Sc Botany
 B.Sc Physics
B.Sc Mathematics (Girls only)
 B.Sc Computer Science (Girls only)
 B.Sc Home Science (Girls only)

Post Graduate Courses (Aided)

Arts Courses
 M.Com

Science Courses
 M.Sc Chemistry
 M.Sc Zoology

Post Graduate Courses (Unaided)

Arts Courses
 M.A. Economics
 M.A. English
 M.A. History
 M.A. Tamil

Science Courses
 M.Sc. Chemistry
 M.Sc. Computer Science
 M.Sc. Information Technology
 M.Sc. Mathematics
 M.Sc. Physics

Research Programmes

M.Phil.

 Chemistry
 Commerce
 Computer Science
 Economics
 English
 Management
 Mathematics
 Physics
 Tamil
 Zoology

Ph.D.

 Chemistry
 Commerce
 Computer Science
 Economics
 English
 Management
 Mathematics
 Physics
 Tamil
 Zoology

Certificate and Diploma Courses (Part-time)
 Foundation Course in Human Rights
 Certificate Course in Human Rights
 Diploma in Yoga
 Post Graduate Diploma in Computer Applications (PGDCA)
Professional Courses

 M.B.A (Marketing, HR & Finance)
 M.C.A

References

Colleges in Tamil Nadu
1955 establishments in Madras State
Academic institutions formerly affiliated with the University of Madras